Colton is a surname of Irish origin. Comhaltán Ua Cleirigh, King of Uí Fiachrach Aidhne in AD 964 appears to be the first recorded use of this name. Comaltan, originally a forename, became Ó Cómhaltáin the surname (son of Comaltan, genitive case) which was eventually anglicized into Colton. Comaltan was an early member of the Ó Cléirigh family, reputedly the oldest surname in Europe. Irish variations include O'Comhaltain (Irish: Ó Cómhaltáin) and Collin, anglicized as "Colton". Some Irish descending Coltons can trace lineage to the notable Kennedy family an American family of Irish descent who are prominent in American politics and government.

People with the surname 
 Ann Ree Colton (1898–1984), founder of "Niscience"
 Charles Colton (disambiguation)
 David Douty Colton (1831–1878), California pioneer, entrepreneur, politician
 Dean Colton, Scottish rugby player
 Don B. Colton (1876–1952), American politician
 Eben Pomeroy Colton (1829–1895), Lieutenant Governor of Vermont
 Edward Andrew Colton (1965-    ), American Law Enforcement Official
 Frank B. Colton (1923–2003), American chemist
 Gardner Quincy Colton (1814–1898), American anesthesiologist
 George Colton (disambiguation)
George Colton (Maryland politician) (1817–1898), American politician, printer and newspaperman
George Radcliffe Colton (1886–1916), Governor of Puerto Rico
 Ginger Colton (1875–1946), Australian rugby player
 Graham Colton (born 1981), American singer-songwriter
 Joel Colton (1918–2011), American historian and author
 John Colton (disambiguation)
John Colton (bishop) (c. 1320–1404), statesman and cleric in Ireland
John Colton (politician) (1823–1902), South Australian politician
John Colton (screenwriter) (1887–1946), American playwright and screenwriter
 J. H. Colton (1800–1893), American Cartographer
 Larry Colton, professional baseball player
 Lillian Colton (1911–2007), American crop artist
 Marie Colton (1922-2018), American politician
 Mark Colton (1961–1995), British racing driver
 Michael Colton, American writer and comedian
 Michael F. B. Colton, (1933-    ), Irish Garda Chief Superintendent ret'd.
 Micky Colton, Canadian military pilot
 Milo Colton, American politician
 Paul Colton, Church of Ireland Bishop of Cork
 Puddin Colton (1874–1958), Australian rugby player
 Roger B. Colton (1887–1978), American Army General during World War II
 Ross Colton (born 1996), American ice hockey player
 Scott Colton (born 1980), American wrestler
 Sabin W. Colton (1847–1925), American investor
 Sandra Colton, American dancer and actress
 Shawna Colton, American model
 Simon Colton, English computer scientist
 Walter Colton (1797–1851), American chaplain, newspaperman, and author
 William Colton (disambiguation)

Fictional characters
 General Joseph Colton, a fictional character in the G.I. Joe universe
 Rosie Colton, a fictional character from the British soap opera Doctors

See also
Kolton, given name and surname

References

External links

Surnames
Surnames of Irish origin

ru:Колтон